Khalilov is a masculine surname, its feminine counterpart is Khalilova. It is derived from the Arabic masculine given name Khalil. Notable people with the surname include:

Farhad Khalilov (born 1946), Azerbaijani painter
Mikhaylo Khalilov (born 1975), Ukrainian cyclist
Rappani Khalilov (1969–2007), Russian rebel
Rauf Khalilov (born 1981), Azerbaijani film director
Salahaddin Khalilov (born 1952), Azerbaijani philosopher
Valery Khalilov (1952–2016), Russian musical composer and military band conductor 
Zahid Khalilov (1911–1974), Azerbaijani mathematician

Azerbaijani-language surnames
Patronymic surnames
Surnames from given names
Masculine surnames